West Virginia Route 38 is an east–west state highway in northern West Virginia. The western terminus of the route is at U.S. Route 250 three miles (5 km) southeast of Philippi. The eastern terminus is at West Virginia Route 72 across the Cheat River from St. George.

Several miles of WV 38 passes through scenic areas of the Monongahela National Forest.

Major intersections

References

038
Transportation in Barbour County, West Virginia
Transportation in Tucker County, West Virginia